Major Arthur George Villiers Peel (27 February 1869 – 25 April 1956) was a British Member of Parliament and writer on politics and economics.

Career
George Peel was the son of Arthur Peel, 1st Viscount Peel, a senior British Liberal politician, and Adelaide Dugdale.

On 6 October 1906 at the age of 38 Peel married Lady Agnes Lygon. He entered New College, Oxford University in 1886, and wrote extensively on politics and economics.

Peel was returned as MP for Spalding in the by-election of 1917, sitting until the constituency was abolished in 1918, and was Clerk to the Treasury.

Peel died aged 88 on 25 April 1956.

Bibliography

He authored or edited many publications, normally under the name George Peel, or abbreviated "G.P." or "G.V.P.":

 Sir Robert Peel, from his private papers, Edited for his trustees by C S Parker ; With a chapter on his life and character by his grandson, the Hon George Peel, John Murray, 1899
 The Enemies of England, Edward Arnold, 1902
 The Friends of England, Murray, 1905
 The Future of England, Macmillan & Co., 1911
 The Tariff Reformers, Methuen & Co., 1913
 The Reign of Sir Edward Carson, P. S. King & Son, 1914
 The Private letters of Sir Robert Peel, Edited by George Peel, John Murray, 1920
 The Economic Impact of America, Macmillan & Co., 1928
 The Economic Policy of France, Macmillan & Co., 1937
 The Work of Sir Robert Peel and its lessons for to-day, Cobden-Sanderson, 1938
 The War: the root and the remedy, England, 1941
 The Fiscal Policy of Europe, London, 1946	
 Imperial Preference, 1894-1945, London, 1945
 How Free Trade Will Come Free Trade Union Pamphlets, London, 1947
He contributed several biographies to the Dictionary of National Biography, including those for:
 Peel, Robert (1750–1830)
 Peel, Robert (1788–1850)
 Campbell, George Douglas

References

1869 births
1956 deaths
Liberal Party (UK) MPs for English constituencies
UK MPs 1910–1918
Younger sons of viscounts
Deputy Lieutenants of Warwickshire
Presidents of the Oxford Union